Manchester school may refer to:

 Manchester Liberalism, a socio-economic and political movement of the 19th century
 The Manchester School (journal), an academic journal of economics
 Manchester school (anthropology), a school of thought in anthropology
 Manchester School of Acting, a drama college in Manchester, England
 Manchester School of Architecture in Manchester, England
 Manchester School of Technology, a school in Manchester, New Hampshire
 Manchester Grammar School, an independent school for boys in Manchester, England
 Manchester School (writers), a term applied to a number of playwrights in Manchester, England, in the early 20th century
 The Manchester School (New Music Manchester), group of composers and performers in 1950s in Manchester, England